Xanthophyllum havilandii is a plant in the family Polygalaceae. It is named for the naturalist George Darby Haviland.

Description
The bark is blackish. The flowers are yellowish when dry.

Distribution and habitat
Xanthophyllum havilandii is endemic to Borneo. Its habitat is lowland mixed dipterocarp forests.

References

havilandii
Endemic flora of Borneo
Plants described in 1896